Milledgeville High School, or MHS, is a public four to five-year high school located at 100 East 8th Street in Milledgeville, Illinois, a village in Carroll County, Illinois, in the Midwestern United States. MHS serves the communities and surrounding areas of Milledgeville, Chadwick, Lanark, Mt. Carroll, Savanna, and Thomson. The campus is located 13 miles north of Sterling, Illinois, and serves a mixed village and rural residential community.

Academics
Based on the Illinois School Report Card for the 2018-19 school year, Milledgeville had a graduation rate of 93% and an Advanced Placement participation rate of 3%. Additionally, in 2019, Milledgeville ranked as the 12,935 best school in the United States and 430 in Illinois based on U.S. News & World Report.

Athletics
Milledgeville High School competes in the Northwest Upstate Illini Conference and is a member school in the Illinois High School Association. Their mascot is the Missiles, with school colors of orange and black. The school has one state championship on record in team athletics and activities.

MHS provides athletic opportunities for a variety of sports including football, volleyball, golf (cooperatively with Eastland High School), boys' basketball, girls' basketball, softball, baseball, boys' track and field (cooperatively with Eastland High School), and girls' track and field (cooperatively with Eastland High School).

History

Milledgeville High School consolidated with Chadwick High School starting with the 1989-1990 school year.  Surrounding communities may have possessed high schools at some time which were consolidated into the current MHS. Potential reference/citation:

References

External links
 Milledgeville High School
 Chadwick-Milledgeville Community Unit School District 399

Public high schools in Illinois
Schools in Carroll County, Illinois